Marcus la Grange (born 12 December 1977) is a South African sprinter who specialises in the 400 metres. His personal best time is 44.65 seconds, achieved in April 2002 in Pretoria. He competed in the 2004 Olympic Games, coming third in the first heat of the men's 400 metres, and was a member of the South African Men's 4 x 400 metres relay race.

Competition record

References

External links
 

1977 births
Living people
South African male sprinters
Athletes (track and field) at the 1998 Commonwealth Games
Athletes (track and field) at the 2002 Commonwealth Games
Commonwealth Games competitors for South Africa
Athletes (track and field) at the 2004 Summer Olympics
Olympic athletes of South Africa
Athletes (track and field) at the 1999 All-Africa Games
African Games competitors for South Africa
20th-century South African people
21st-century South African people